Leeds City Football Club was the leading professional club in Leeds, England, before the First World War. The club was highly successful in the wartime football league however it faced sanction for paying it's players during wartime which had been made illegal. The club was dissolved in 1919 after the club's directors failed to co-operate with the subsequent FA inquiry. In 1919 Leeds United was established as a replacement.

History
The club was established in 1904, taking the coat of arms of Leeds as the club badge and adopting blue, yellow and white as the club's colours. They were elected to the Football League in 1905. The original secretary, a role that then also carried the modern responsibilities of manager and coach, was Gilbert Gillies (1904–1908) who was followed by Frank Scott-Walford before in 1912, they appointed Herbert Chapman who guided the club to their highest position in the league (4th in the Second Division).

Leeds City's whole league career was in the Second Division. However, during the First World War the club won several wartime honours under the stewardship of Herbert Chapman. Following the conclusion of the war a scandal ensued and the club was accused of financial irregularities, including breaking the ban on paying players during the war, that led to the club's dissolution in 1919. They were expelled from The Football League eight games into the 1919–20 season. The harsh punishment was handed down mostly because of the behaviour of the club's directors, who refused to co-operate in an FA inquiry, and refused to hand over the club's financial records.

Port Vale took over their remaining fixtures (as well as their results up to that point). Leeds City were the first club to be expelled from the League mid-season, and one of only two to be expelled from the League due to financial irregularities, with Bury expelled a century later in 2019. Ironically, Leeds City's successors, Port Vale, nearly lost their League status for similar reasons in 1968, although they ultimately managed to retain it in an end-of-season vote among the other clubs.
On 17 October 1919, an auction was held at the Metropole Hotel in Leeds, where the playing staff was auctioned off along with other assets of the club. The 16 members of the playing squad were bought by nine clubs for a total of £9,250:

In the wake of its demise, Leeds United was formed, and entered the Football League the following year. None of the players auctioned ever played for the new Leeds United, but winger Ivan Sharpe, who had scored 17 goals in 65 appearances for City between 1913 and 1915, spent 2½ years at United between 1920 and 1923 only making one appearance and right-half Harry Sherwin, who left City just five months before its dissolution, went on to score twice in 107 games for United between 1921 and 1925.

See also: :Category:Leeds City F.C. players

Subsequent clubs
A second Leeds City was established in 1924 as an amateur club and joined the Yorkshire League. That club folded after leaving the league at the end of the 1926–27 season.

Another Leeds City was formed in 2006 and joined Division Two of the West Yorkshire League. They were Division Two runners-up in their first season, earning promotion to Division One. The following season saw them finish as runners-up in Division One, resulting in promotion to the Premier Division.

Honours
War-time
Midland Sub Tournament North: Winners 1915–16
Midland Section: Winners 1916–17, 1917–18
League Championship Cup: Winners 1917–18

Ground
Having originally played at the Wellington Ground, the club moved into Elland Road after Holbeck Rugby Club folded in October 1904. In their first season in the Football League their average attendance was 10,025, the third highest in the Second Division. Their best season, 1913–14, saw them average 15,845.

References

External links
The complete Leeds City match statistics WAFLL
All Leeds City Football League results and tables at footballsite
The Leeds City years Mighty Leeds
The Leeds City Scandal Mighty Leeds

Leeds City F.C.
Defunct football clubs in England
Defunct football clubs in West Yorkshire
Association football clubs established in 1904
Association football clubs disestablished in 1919
Sport in Leeds
1904 establishments in England
1919 disestablishments in England
Defunct English Football League clubs
Yorkshire Football League
West Yorkshire Association Football League
Football clubs in England